"From Russia Without Love" is the 645th episode of the American animated television series The Simpsons and the sixth episode of season 30.

Plot
Concerned that they are inviting too many people over to Thanksgiving dinner as they drink too much, Marge asks Homer to uninvite Moe. A depressed Moe then stops reacting angrily to Bart's prank calls, so Bart, Milhouse and Nelson decide to up their game by accessing the dark web with the help of Herman. They order a mail order wife for Moe, a beautiful woman named Anastasia who shows up at the bar. Moe denies sending for her but allows her to stay. She transforms the bar into a high-class establishment. Moe is smitten with Anastasia, but has had his heart broken too many times and refuses to become romantically involved, so she decides to move out and take a job at the Russian Tea House in Odgenville.

However, Homer sees Bart receiving a dark web package from Herman under the name "Ima Buttface", a pregnant Sumatran breeding rat, and becomes suspicious. He and Marge interrogate Bart and threaten to destroy his phone until he confesses his dark web dealings. While Marge gives Bart a series of punishments, Homer rushes off to tell Moe the truth and encourage him to fight for Anastasia. He tracks her down to the Tea House she is working at, only to see her dating Krusty. With the encouragement of the barflies, he crashes their picnic date and confesses his love for Anastasia. She breaks up with Krusty and agrees to honor the contract.

Bart is then cajoled into helping out at Moe and Anastasia's wedding, which Marge says will be Bart's last punishment. However, he, Milhouse and Nelson have learned Russian off the dark web and realize the marriage contract is actually a legal document giving Anastasia all the rights to Moe's property; and promptly expose this at the altar. When this is made known to Moe, he refuses to marry her as she had lied to him about the contract. To his horror, Anastasia then admits she is actually an American scam artist. Moe then orders her to leave, so she proceeds to seduce Groundskeeper Willie by pretending to be Scottish.

Reception

Tony Sokol of Den of Geek gave the episode 3 and a half out of 5 points ranking, stating the episode "comes after a thawing on the crucible of social media fit a square peg into an oval orifice. There is no political commentary in the episode, and the social commentary is only on the catfish. The international incident turns out to be all too domestic. 'From Russia Without Love' is a long sad look into Moe. Something most communities prefer to avert their eyes from. But Springfield isn't just any neighborhood. It doesn't even know what state it's in. The episode ends on further sorrow as Nelson gets stranded on an outpost a planet away where smokes are hard to come by. Featuring the two secondary characters lets the series breathe a little less shallowly as The Simpsons 30th season finds them looking back at narrative and internal development."

Dennis Perkins of The A.V. Club gave the episode a C+, stating "There's just too little investment in the script (credited to Michael Ferris) in either the emotional side of Moe's dilemma or the potential dark comedy inherent in the whole mail-order plot. Weirdly, I was put in mind of the early-run Aqua Teen Hunger Force episode (called 'Mail Order Bride') on the same subject, where at least that intermittently brilliant show's grimy chaos felt at home to the latter theme...Here, 'From Russia Without Love' tries to go light and dark at once, and can't manage either.

“From Russia Without Love” scored a 4 share and was watched by 2.35 million viewers, making “The Simpsons” Fox's highest rated show of the night.

References

External links

The Simpsons (season 30) episodes
2018 American television episodes
Television episodes about weddings